Iceland competed at the 2000 Summer Olympics in Sydney, Australia.

Medalists

Delegation

Gymnastics

Track & Field

Sailing

Shooting

Swimming

Results by event

Athletics

Men
Field events

Women
Track & road events

Field events

Combined events – Decathlon

Gymnastics

Men's artistic individual all-around
 Rúnar Alexandersson (50th place)

Sailing

Open

Shooting

Men's Skeet
 Alfred Karl Alfredsson (47th place)

Swimming

Men

Women

References

sports-reference
Wallechinsky, David (2004). The Complete Book of the Summer Olympics (Athens 2004 Edition). Toronto, Canada. .
International Olympic Committee (2001). The Results. Retrieved 12 November 2005.
Sydney Organising Committee for the Olympic Games (2001). Official Report of the XXVII Olympiad Volume 1: Preparing for the Games. Retrieved 20 November 2005.
Sydney Organising Committee for the Olympic Games (2001). Official Report of the XXVII Olympiad Volume 2: Celebrating the Games. Retrieved 20 November 2005.
Sydney Organising Committee for the Olympic Games (2001). The Results. Retrieved 20 November 2005.
International Olympic Committee Web Site

External links
Ólympíuvefurinn (Icelandic only)

Nations at the 2000 Summer Olympics
2000 Summer Olympics
Summer Olympics